Events from the 1010s in England.

Incumbents
Monarch – Ethelred (to December 1013), Sweyn (December 1013 to 3 February 1014), Ethelred (3 February 1014 to 23 April 1016), Edmund II (23 April to 30 November 1016), then Canute

Events
 1010
 5 May – Battle of Ringmere: Danish leader Thorkell the Tall defeats an English army under Ulfcytel Snillingr and ravages East Anglia and Mercia.
 1011
 29 September – Siege of Canterbury: Danes capture Canterbury after a siege, taking Ælfheah, Archbishop of Canterbury, as a prisoner.
 Byrhtferth of Ramsey Abbey writes his Manual (Enchiridion) on the divine order of the universe and time.
 1012
 Late 1011 or early 1012 (?) – Battle of Nýjamóđa ("Newmouth") near Orford, Suffolk, fought between English and Danes.
 Heregeld tax is introduced to pay Anglo-Scandinavian mercenaries to fight the Danes.
 April – King Æthelred the Unready pays £48,000 Danegeld.
 19 April – Danes kill Ælfheah of Canterbury, probably at Greenwich, before leaving the country.
 1013
 July – Sweyn Forkbeard, King of Denmark, having invaded the country, is proclaimed as King within the Danelaw.
 25 December – Sweyn is proclaimed King of all England in London, forcing Æthelred to flee to Normandy.
 Lyfing is appointed by Æthelred as Archbishop of Canterbury.
 1014
 3 February – Sweyn dies at Gainsborough, Lincolnshire, and his son Cnut is proclaimed King of England by the Vikings.
 March – Æthelred returns to reclaim his throne at the invitation of English nobles.
 April – Cnut returns to Denmark to enforce his rule there.
 Possible date – Olaf II Haraldsson of Norway perhaps attacks London in support of Æthelred.
Wulfstan II, Archbishop of York preaches his Latin homily Sermo Lupi ad Anglos ("Wulf's Address to the English"), describing the Danes as "God's judgement on England".
 1015
Sigeferth and Morcar, chief thegns of the Five Boroughs of the Danelaw, come to an assembly in Oxford where they are murdered by Eadric Streona. Æthelred orders that Sigeferth's widow, probably named Ealdgyth, be seized and brought to Malmesbury Abbey, but Æthelred's son, Edmund Ironside, seizes and marries her by mid-August.
 August – Cnut launches an invasion of England.
 1016
 23 April – King Æthelred dies, and is succeeded by his son Edmund Ironside.
 May – Battle of Brentford: King Edmund defeats Cnut, who then besieges London.
 18 October – Battle of Ashingdon: Cnut defeats King Edmund, leaving the latter as king of Wessex only.
 30 November – King Edmund dies and Cnut takes control of the whole country.
 1017
 c. July – Cnut marries Æthelred's widow Emma of Normandy.
 Cnut divides England into the four Earldoms of Wessex, Mercia, East Anglia, and Northumbria controlled by himself, Eadric Streona, Thorkell the Tall, and Eric Haakonsson respectively.
 Christmas – Cnut has Eadric killed and Leofric becomes Earl of Mercia.
 1018
 Cnut succeeds his brother Harald II of Denmark on the Danish throne.
 Buckfast Abbey founded in Devon.
 Cnut levies £10,500 to pay heregeld.
 1019
 Exeter monastery restored by Cnut.

Births
 1015 or 1016
 King Harold Harefoot (died 1040)
 c. 1018
 King Harthacnut (died 1042)

Deaths
 1010
 Ælfric of Eynsham, abbot (born c. 955)
 1012
 19 April – Archbishop Ælfheah of Canterbury (born 954)
 1016
 23 April – King Æthelred the Unready (born c. 968)
 30 November – King Edmund Ironside
 1017
 December – Eadric Streona, ealdorman

References